Perry Airport may refer to:

 Perry-Foley Airport in Perry, Florida, United States (FAA: 40J)
 Perry-Houston County Airportin Perry, Georgia, United States (FAA: PXE)
 Perry-Warsaw Airport in Perry, New York, United States (FAA: 01G)

See also 
 Perry County Airport (disambiguation)
 Perry Municipal Airport (disambiguation)